is a Japanese actress. She appeared in more than twenty films since 1959.

Selected filmography

External links 

1933 births
Living people
Japanese film actresses